Gabriel's Mother's Highway is the second studio album by Dutch-Australian folk and gospel musician Franciscus Henri. The album was released in September 1972 by Move Records, as a 33 rpm vinyl record. It includes five tracks written by English poet Sydney Carter. The album was produced by Brian Cadd and recorded at Armstrong Studios in Melbourne.

Track listing

Move Records, catalogue no. MS-3007

1972 albums
Franciscus Henri albums